The 1995 Island Games in Gibraltar was the 4th edition in which a men's football (soccer) tournament was played at the multi-games competition. It was contested by 8 teams.

Isle of Wight won the tournament for the first time.

Participants

 Isle of Man

Group phase

Group 1

Group 2

Placement play-off matches

7th place match

5th place match

Final stage

Semi-finals

3rd Place Match

Final

Final rankings

Top goalscorers

4 goals
 Adam Barsdell

External links
Official 1995 website

1995
Gibraltar in international football
1995–96 in European football
1995 in Gibraltar
Island